Glen William Vaihu (born 8 October 2001) is an Australian rugby union player who plays for the  in Super Rugby. His playing position is centre or wing. He was named in the Rebels squad for the 2021 Super Rugby AU season.

Super Rugby statistics

Reference list

External links
Rugby.com.au profile
itsrugby.co.uk profile

Australian rugby union players
Living people
Rugby union centres
Rugby union wings
Melbourne Rebels players
2001 births
Rugby union players from Melbourne